Harrison Home may refer to:
Grouseland, home of William Henry Harrison
Benjamin Harrison Home, home of Benjamin Harrison
Harrison House (Fredericton), university residence at University of New Brunswick